Alistair Sperring (born 26 October 1963) is an English retired professional footballer who played as a goalkeeper. Born on Hayling Island, Sperring began his career with Southampton in 1983, and later played for Swindon Town, Bognor Regis Town and Hayling United.

Career
Alistair Sperring initially joined the Southampton F.C. Academy as an apprentice in July 1980 at the age of 16, before signing professional terms in August 1983. He made his first and only appearance for the club on 8 November 1983 in the third round of the League Cup against Rotherham United, which the Saints lost 2–1. During the game, the goalkeeper missed the ball with a punch and collided with teammate Mark Wright, who had to be substituted off due to a broken nose.

After a brief loan spell with Swindon Town between August and September 1984, Sperring left Southampton. He completed a trial for Reading in January 1985, and later joined Bognor Regis Town in May 1986. The goalkeeper returned to Hayling Island at the end of the year to end his playing career with Hayling United. After retiring from football, Sperring entered the motor industry and eventually became the managing director of Havant Motor Factors, a spare parts specialist.

References

Bibliography 

1963 births
People from Hayling Island
Living people
English footballers
Association football goalkeepers
Southampton F.C. players
Swindon Town F.C. players
Bognor Regis Town F.C. players